The  is an electronic musical synthesizer. It was developed in Japan by the CUBE toy company and the Maywa Denki design firm, led by the brothers Masamichi and Nobumichi Tosa.

Description
The Otamatone is a synthesizer whose body is shaped like an eighth note (quaver) (it also somewhat resembles a tadpole, or a ladle,  being Japanese for tadpole and ladle), with sound emerging from a "mouth" on the notehead. It requires two hands to play: while one hand holds and squeezes the "head", the other hand controls the pitch of the tune by placing the finger on a ribbon controller on the stem; a higher position on the stem creates a lower sound.

The ribbon controller is logarithmic to resemble a string instrument, so there is a shorter distance between higher notes than between lower ones. Varying the pressure on the head (thereby opening and closing the "mouth" of the Otamatone) creates a wah-wah effect, and shaking the neck (and thereby slightly changing pressure on the head) creates a vibrato effect. Switches on the back of the head allow users to change octave, turn it off or on, or change the volume.

The structure on top of the Otamatone's stem is called the tail.

The sound made by this instrument can be compared to the sound of a theremin, or jinghu.

Variations
The Otamatone has different models, such as the Otamatone Melody, a smaller Otamatone that can be held on a keychain; or the Otamatone deluxe, a bigger Otamatone with more features. Some Otamatones have designs based of popular Japan based characters, like Kirby or Hello Kitty.

Reception 
The instrument has gained significant popularity online, especially on YouTube and TikTok. It is often used to create cover songs, with channels such as TheRealSullyG and mklachu gaining popularity primarily from the use of the instrument. The Otamatone has also been used by musicians such as Ola Englund.

On February 3, 2021, Juanjo Monserrat performed Nessun Dorma on the original Otamatone on the auditions for the sixth season of Got Talent España and won the Golden Buzzer award after several judges tried playing the instrument themselves.

References

External links
 

Japanese musical instruments
Toy instruments and noisemakers